Ai Soma (born 15 September 1997) is a Japanese swimmer. She competed in the women's 50 metre butterfly event at the 2018 FINA World Swimming Championships (25 m), in Hangzhou, China.

References

External links
 

1997 births
Living people
Japanese female butterfly swimmers
Place of birth missing (living people)
Asian Games medalists in swimming
Asian Games gold medalists for Japan
Medalists at the 2018 Asian Games
Swimmers at the 2018 Asian Games
Universiade medalists in swimming
Universiade silver medalists for Japan
Medalists at the 2019 Summer Universiade
21st-century Japanese women